Benjamin Karl Fletcher (born 13 March 1992) is a former British and now Irish judoka.

Judo career
As a junior, Fletcher won bronze at the 2011 World Junior Championships in Cape Town. He is a three times champion of Great Britain, winning the half-heavyweight division at the British Judo Championships in 2013, 2014 and 2016.

In 2016, he was selected by Great Britain to compete at the 2016 Summer Olympics in the Men's -100 kg event, where he was defeated in his second round match. 

In 2017, he changed his nationality to that of Ireland, after which he won the title at the 2017 Hong Kong Asian Open. He started 2018 by winning gold at the Tunis Grand Prix, becoming the first Judoka representing Ireland to ever win an IJF World Judo Tour event. He followed it up with more success that year taking silver at a prestigious Grand Slam event in Dussëldorf and bronze at the Antalya Grand Prix.

Personal life
His sister Megan Fletcher is also an international judoka.

References

External links
 
 
 
 

1992 births
Living people
Irish male judoka
Olympic judoka of Great Britain
Judoka at the 2016 Summer Olympics
European Games competitors for Great Britain
Judoka at the 2015 European Games
Judoka at the 2020 Summer Olympics
Olympic judoka of Ireland